= Charles Linville =

American veteran and mountaineer (born 1985)

Charlie Linville
- Born: Charles Linville; 1985 (age 40–41). Boise, Idaho, U.S.
- Children: 2
- Military career
- Allegiance: United States
- Branch: United States Marine Corps
- Service years: 2006 – 2013
- Rank: Staff Sergeant
- Awards: Purple Heart

Charles "Charlie" Linville (born August 22, 1985) is an American military veteran who is the first combat-wounded veteran ever to summit Mount Everest. He made this climb after three years of training. Linville was injured when serving his second tour in Afghanistan.

== Early life and education ==
Charles Linville was born in Boise, Idaho and is the youngest of four children. He has three older sisters, Blank, Elizabeth, and Heather. His father was diagnosed with Non-Hodgkin's Lymphoma when Linville was a freshman in high school. Linville enlisted in the Marine Corps and attended a boot camp in California in 2006. He then went to the School of Infantry at Marine Corps Base Camp Pendleton and completed SOI training. He completed additional training at Marine Corps Recruit Depot San Diego.

== Career ==
Linville became an assault specialist and was deployed to Iraq. During his tour, he was promoted to Corporal. After returning from Iraq, Linville decided to pursue explosives further. He was sent to Afghanistan in 2010. He was then placed with a different EOD team and worked in Sangin, where he continued to disarm many IEDs. On January 20, 2011, he was conducting a post-blast analysis sweep, and was struck by an IED. He had multiple injuries and was immediately evacuated to Bastian Medical Center for hand surgery. Linville has multiple other surgeries on his hand and foot. He lost his foot after 14 months, and received the Purple Heart.

In 2014, he joined the Heroes Project, a 501(c)(3) organization under the leadership of Tim Medvetz, to climb Mount Everest, and he became the first combat-wounded veteran to summit Mount Everest.
